Sheila S. Coronel is a Philippines-born investigative journalist and journalism professor. She is one of the founders of the Philippine Center for Investigative Journalism (PCIJ). In 2006, she was named the inaugural director of the Stabile Center for Investigative Journalism at Columbia University's Graduate School of Journalism. In 2014, she was appointed the School's Academic Dean, a position she held until the end of 2020.

Biography
Coronel began her journalism career during the twilight of the dictatorship of Ferdinand Marcos. After the People Power Revolution that ousted Marcos, she worked as a political reporter for The Manila Times and The Manila Chronicle, and in 1989, became the first executive director of the PCIJ, one of the earliest nonprofit investigative centers to be formed globally.

In a series of articles in 2001, the Philippine Center for Investigative Journalism exposed corruption by then-President Joseph Estrada; the series sparked impeachment hearings in the Philippine Senate and a popular uprising that ousted the president.

As academic dean and director of the Stabile Center, she has helped build and advance the Columbia Journalism School's investigative and data journalism curricula, including the creation of a master's degree in data journalism. She has also taught journalism courses and spoken at conferences around the world.

Coronel is board chair of the Media Development Investment Fund, which invests in independent media in countries with a history of media repression. She also sits on the boards of the Committee to Protect Journalists, the Columbia Journalism Review, and ProPublica. In addition, she is a member and former board chair of the International Consortium of Investigative Journalists.

Her recent work is on the populist Philippine President Rodrigo Duterte and police abuses in the war on drugs. She wrote about the link between police corruption and human rights abuses in the book, A Duterte Reader. In a 2019 article for The Atlantic, she and two Stabile Center fellows estimated that the casualties in Duterte's drug war were three times more than what the police claimed. As part of a series on populist autocrats published by Foreign Affairs, she traced Duterte's rise from the gun-toting mayor of Davao City to president. She has also written about populist threats to democracy and press freedom.

Awards and honors
In early 1999, Coronel received the McLuhan Prize from the Canadian Embassy in Manila for her work as an investigative journalist. In 2001, she was named the Philippines' Best Print Journalist. After winning the Best Investigative Journalism Award four times in last 12 years, in 2001 she was included in the Hall of Fame list of Jaime V. Ongpin Awards for Investigative Journalism. In 2003, Coronel received the Magsaysay Award for Journalism, Literature and Creative Communication Arts.

Publications
Coronel is the author or editor of a number of books on investigative journalism and Philippine politics and society, including The Rulemakers: How the Wealthy and Well-Born Dominate Congress; Pork and Other Perks: Corruption and Governance in the Philippines; and Coups, Cults & Cannibals.

References

External links
Podcast Interview with the San Francisco Chronicle.

Year of birth missing (living people)
Living people
Alumni of the London School of Economics
Columbia University faculty
Columbia University Graduate School of Journalism faculty
Filipino women writers
Filipino writers
Ramon Magsaysay Award winners
University of the Philippines Diliman alumni